

580001–580100 

|-bgcolor=#f2f2f2
| colspan=4 align=center | 
|}

580101–580200 

|-id=123
| 580123 Gedek || || Marcin Gedek (born 1978), a Polish amateur astronomer who has set up a number of remotely operated observatories, one of which is the Polonia Observatory  in Chile, where comet C/2015 F2 (Polonia) was discovered. || 
|}

580201–580300 

|-bgcolor=#f2f2f2
| colspan=4 align=center | 
|}

580301–580400 

|-
| 580301 Aznarmacías ||  || Amadeo Aznar Macías (born 1974) is a Spanish astronomer with EURONEAR, astronomy communicator, and expert in light-curve photometry of binary near-Earth, Mars-crossing and main-belt asteroids. || 
|}

580401–580500 

|-bgcolor=#f2f2f2
| colspan=4 align=center | 
|}

580501–580600 

|-bgcolor=#f2f2f2
| colspan=4 align=center | 
|}

580601–580700 

|-bgcolor=#f2f2f2
| colspan=4 align=center | 
|}

580701–580800 

|-bgcolor=#f2f2f2
| colspan=4 align=center | 
|}

580801–580900 

|-bgcolor=#f2f2f2
| colspan=4 align=center | 
|}

580901–581000 

|-bgcolor=#f2f2f2
| colspan=4 align=center | 
|}

References 

580001-581000